John Gray (8 December 1819 – 25 November 1872) was a Scottish merchant seaman and master mariner who served as Captain of the SS Great Britain for eighteen years. He died in mysterious circumstances, after apparently jumping or falling overboard.

Early life 

Gray, was born on 8 December 1819 at Valand, Westing, Unst, in the Shetland Isles, the son of Sarah (née Johnson) and Robert Gray.

He went to sea at a young age, initially joining the Eagle Line.

Career 

Gray progressed to commanding ships for Gibbs, Bright & Co. He took both a demotion and a pay cut in order to serve as Second Officer on their SS Great Britain in 1852, in time for the vessel's first voyage to Australia. He was promoted to First Officer for the second Australian voyage, then made Captain in April 1854, prior to the third, following the resignation of his predecessor Captain Matthews. He held the longest tenure of any SS Great Britain captain, and in that role completed 27 journeys from the United Kingdom to Australia and back. He was also her captain when she was used as a troop ship, during the Crimean War and the Indian Rebellion.

In 1869 a passenger wrote that he was:

Death 

On his two penultimate voyages to Australia and back, Gray, according to subsequent newspaper reports:

On 25 November 1872, thirty days into another return voyage from Melbourne to Liverpool, Gray complained of pain in his bowels and returned to his cabin. Near midnight he was seen walking towards the ship's deck. The next morning, he could not be found, and one of the transom windows at the ship's stern was open, having been locked the night before. The letter he had been seen writing that night could not be found.

Since there was no way to send a message ashore, his wife Mary Ann (née Jamieson) only found out that she was a widow when she and one of their daughters met the ship upon its arrival in Liverpool in January 1873. His death was reported on the front pages of newspapers in the United Kingdom and in Australia.

In fiction 

The novel Revenge My Death by Bill Jackman tells an invented story of Gray's disappearance being due to him being kidnapped by a passenger.

References

External links 

 Biography published by the SS Great Britain Trust

1819 births
1872 deaths
Male sailors
19th-century sailors
Scottish sailors
Steamship captains
People who died at sea
People from Unst